A shoulder mark, also called rank slide, or slip-on, is a flat cloth sleeve worn on the shoulder strap of a uniform. It may bear rank or other insignia. A shoulder mark should not be confused with a shoulder board (which is an elaborate shoulder strap), shoulder knot (a braided sort of shoulder board) or epaulette, although these terms are often used interchangeably.

Australia
The newer Auscam uniform design lacks shoulder marks, instead opting for a vertical strap in the middle of the chest region of the uniform. Rank insignia tags are slipped onto this strap. Unlike the older uniform designs, there are slip-ons for every rank in the Australian Defence Force.

The older Auscam uniform designs featured shoulder straps, upon which slip-on rank insignia of Commissioned Officers could be affixed, and non-commissioned officers in the Air Force and Navy only. No shoulder-strap slip-ons are available for enlisted members of the army, whereas the other two services had appropriate slip ons, who have rank patches sewed onto the uniform arms. This older design is no longer issued, but may still be seen on personnel whose most recent uniform issue pre-dates the use of the new design.

Canada

In the Canadian Forces, slip-ons displaying rank insignia and shoulder titles are worn on the shoulder straps of the No. 3 Service Dress shirt, overcoat, raincoat, and sweater; CANEX parka and windbreaker; Naval Combat Dress jacket and shirt; flying suits and flying jackets; and Military Police Operational Patrol Dress shirt and jacket. The slip-ons are worn on a similar-style strap located in the centre of the chest (and sometimes centre of the back as well) of the CADPAT shirt, jacket, parka, and raincoat. Slip-ons are not worn on the Service Dress jacket, or with Mess Dress.

United States

Military
Based on the shoulder boards used by the United States Navy, the United States Army and Air Force developed the shoulder mark, a cloth tube with embroidered or pinned rank insignia. Army officer shoulder marks are colored depending on the branch with which the officer is affiliated. They have an 1/8-inch gold stripe below the embroidered grade insignia (the end far from the collar). In the Air Force, a similar stripe is limited to senior officers (majors and above). Air Force general officers have an additional stripe at the near end. Enlisted and Air Force junior officer shoulder marks lack these distinctions. These are worn on all class B uniform shirts. US Navy officers wear shoulder boards on Summer White and Service Dress White uniforms, and wool overcoats and reefers. "Soft shoulder boards" (shoulder marks) are worn on long sleeve white shirts and on black sweaters worn with Service Khaki or Service Dress Blue uniforms. Coast Guard officers wear Naval style shoulderboards on all class B uniform shirts.
Service dress uniforms in the U.S. air and land forces also have a different style of shoulder board, a firm material with an underlying longitudinal strap. The corresponding jacket shoulder has two small loops traversing from rear to front, and the open end of the shoulder board's strap is drawn through the two loops and affixed to the underside of the board. This effectively hides all the means of attachments, leaving a firm, finished surface. This particular style is what U.S. Air Force personnel call a shoulder board. The shoulder sleeve is called an epaulette, and the two are never confused.

On the United States Army Blue Service Uniform, officers wear embroidered rank insignia "shoulder straps" (attentes) mounted lengthwise on the outside shoulder seams. These are 1⅝ inches wide by 4 inches/3½ inches (large size/small size) long, and are sewn, snapped, or clipped onto each shoulder.

Boy Scouts of America
The Boy Scouts of America uses colored shoulder loops worn on the shoulder straps to indicate the program level. Webelos Scouts wearing tan uniforms and all Cub Scout leaders wear blue loops, Boy Scouts and leaders wear forest green loops (changed from red in 2008), Varsity Scouts and leaders wear blaze (orange) loops, and Venturers and leaders wear emerald green loops. Adults who hold a district or council position wear silver loops; those with section, area, regional, or national positions wear gold loops, and those with international positions wear purple loops. The only youth permitted to wear gold loops are the National Chief, National Vice chief, and Region Chiefs of the Order of the Arrow.

United Kingdom

Military

Rank slides are used by all of the UK Armed Forces, primarily on working dress uniforms. Similar rank slides are also worn on a single tab/strap on the chest of operational (Multi-Terrain Pattern) clothing.

Royal Navy
Shoulder boards are worn by officers on tropical dress uniform, bearing the same insignia carried on the cuffs of the dress uniform. A slide worn on the chest indicates rank for all RN personnel in Action Working Dress (No.4 dress).

Army
In the British Army, shoulder straps are worn with dress and service uniforms. In combat dress, however, rank insignia is displayed on 'rank slides' worn on the chest.

Royal Air Force
In the Royal Air Force, rank slides are worn by all ranks (except Aircraftman, which has no insignia) on the shoulders of working dress uniforms, and also on flying clothing and overalls.

St. John Ambulance
As a ranked organisation, members of St. John Ambulance wear rank slides on all uniforms. Colours are used to differentiate between different health care professionals (e.g., green for paramedics, red for doctors).

Police

The uniforms of most police forces in the United Kingdom feature rank slides.  At ranks below Inspector, the collar number is also displayed on the shoulder, although some Inspectors and above are starting to display their collar number alongside their rank insignia. The most notable exception to this is Kent Police, whose officers display their collar number on the stab vest instead of the rank slides.

Public order officers' shoulder slides are often colour-coded according to their role:
 Silver commander – Grey
 Bronze commander – Yellow
 PSU commander – Red
 PSU sergeant – White
 Medic – Green
 Tactical advisor – Royal blue
 Evidence gatherer – Orange

HM Prison Service 
The uniform of public sector Prison Officers and OSG’s in England & Wales feature shoulder slides on their uniform indicating rank, unique identification number and specialist role.

Specialist role identifiers include:
DH – Dog Handler
W – Works Officer
H – Healthcare Officer

Lord-lieutenants  
The uniforms of lord-lieutenants as heads of a lieutenancy area each show many military features. Their ranks, and those of their deputies (vice lord-lieutenant, deputy lieutenant) are indicated by braided shoulder boards resp. shoulder knots.

References

Notes

External links

Formal insignia
Law enforcement uniforms
Military terminology
Military uniforms
Scouting uniform
Armwear
Shoulder

ja:肩章
sv:Axelklaff
zh:肩章